Shuruppak ("the healing place"), modern Tell Fara, was an ancient Sumerian city situated about 55 kilometres (35 mi) south of Nippur on the banks of the Euphrates in Iraq's Al-Qādisiyyah Governorate. Shuruppak was dedicated to Ninlil, also called Sud, the goddess of grain and the air.

Shuruppak and its environment
Shuruppak is located in Al-Qādisiyyah Governorate, approximately 55 kilometres (35 mi) south of Nippur. The site of extends about a kilometer from north to south. The total area is about 120 hectares, with about 35 hectares of the mound being more than 3 meters above the surrounding plain, with a maximum of 9 meters.

Archaeology
 

After a brief survey by Hermann Volrath Hilprecht in 1900, it was first excavated in 1902 by Robert Koldewey and Friedrich Delitzsch of the German Oriental Society for eight months. Among other finds, hundreds of Early Dynastic tablets were collected, which ended up in the Berlin Museum and the Istanbul Museum. In March and April 1931, a joint team of the American Schools of Oriental Research and the University of Pennsylvania excavated Shuruppak for a further six week season, with Erich Schmidt as director and with epigraphist Samuel Noah Kramer. The excavation recovered 87 tablets and fragments—mostly from pre-Sargonic times—biconvex, and unbaked. In 1973, a three-day surface survey of the site was conducted by Harriet P. Martin. Consisting mainly of pottery shard collection, the survey confirmed that Shuruppak dates at least as early as the Jemdet Nasr period, expanded greatly in the Early Dynastic period, and was also an element of the Akkadian Empire and the Third Dynasty of Ur. A surface survey was conducted in 2016 to 2018.

Recently a full magnetometer survey of the site was completed. The researchers found thousands of robber holes left by looters which had disturbed surface in many places. They were able to use remains of the 900 meter long trench left by excavators in 1902 and 1903 to orient old excavation documents and aerial mapping with their geomagnetic results. Part of the site was inaccessible because of the spoil heaps from the excavations. A city wall was found (in Area A), which had been missed in the past.

Occupation history

Shuruppak became a grain storage and distribution city and had more silos than any other Sumerian city. The earliest excavated levels at Shuruppak date to the Jemdet Nasr period about 3000 BC; it was abandoned shortly after 2000 BC. Erich Schmidt found one Isin-Larsa cylinder seal and several pottery plaques which may date to early in the second millennium BC. Surface finds are predominantly Early Dynastic.

The report of the 1930s excavation mentions a layer of flood deposits at the end of the Jemdet Nasr period at Shuruppak. More recently, it has been suggested that the nature of this deposit is more like that deposited by river avulsions, a process that was very common in the Tigris–Euphrates river system.

Metalwork
Several objects made of arsenical copper were found in Shuruppak/Fara dating from the mid-fourth to early third millennium BC (approximately Jamdat Nasr period), which is quite early for Mesopotamia. Similar objects were also found at Tepe Gawra (levels XII-VIII).

The city expanded to its greatest extent at the end of the Early Dynastic III period (2600 BC to 2350 BC) when it covered about 100 hectares. At this stage it was destroyed by a fire which baked the clay tablets and mudbrick walls, which then survived for millennia.

Two possible kings of Shuruppak are mentioned in epigraphic data from later sources found elsewhere. In some versions of the Sumerian King List a king Ubara-Tutu is listed as the ruler of Shuruppak and the last king "before the flood". In the Epic of Gilgamesh, a man named Utanapishtim (also Uta-na'ishtim), son of Ubara-Tutu, is noted to be king of Shuruppak. The names Ziusudra and Atrahasis are also associated with him. These figures have not been supported by archaeological finds and may well be mythical.

See also
 History of Sumer
 List of cities of the ancient Near East
 Instructions of Shuruppak

Notes

References
 Andrae, W., "Aus einem Berichte W. Andrae's über seineExkursion  von  Fara  nach  den  südbabylonischen  Ruinenstätten(TellǏd, Jǒcha und Hamam)", Mitteilungen der Deutschen Orient-Gesellschaft,16, pp. 16–24, 1902 (in german)
 Andrae, W., "Die Umgebung von Fara und Abu Hatab (Fara,Bismaja, Abu Hatab, Hˇetime, Dschidr und Juba’i)", Mitteilungen derDeutschen Orient-Gesellschaft,16, pp. 24–30, 1902 (in german)
 Andrae, W., "Ausgrabungen in Fara und Abu Hatab. Bericht über dieZeit vom 15. August 1902 bis 10. Januar 1903", Mitteilungen derDeutschen Orient-Gesellschaft,17, pp.4–35, 1903 (in german)
 Koldewey, R., "Acht Briefe Dr. Koldewey's (teilweise im Auszug)(Babylon, Fara und Abu Hatab)", Mitteilungen der Deutschen Orient-Gesellschaft,15, pp. 6–24, 1902 (in german)
 Koldewey, R., "Auszug aus fünf Briefen Dr. Koldewey's (Babylon,Fara und Abu Hatab)", Mitteilungen der Deutschen Orient-Gesellschaft,16, pp. 8–15, 1902 (in german)
 
 Nöldeke, A., "Die Rückkehr unserer Expedition aus Fara", Mitteilun-gen der Deutschen Orient-Gesellschaft,17, pp. 35–44, 1903 (in german)
 
 Wencel, M. M., "New radiocarbon dates from southern Mesopotamia (Fara and Ur)", Iraq, 80, pp. 251-261, 2018

External links
 E Schmidt 1931 excavtion video at Archive.org
Aramco article on Samuel Kramer
Photographs from the University of Pennsylvania expedition to Fara

 
Populated places established in the 3rd millennium BC
Populated places disestablished in the 2nd millennium BC
1900 archaeological discoveries
Al-Qādisiyyah Governorate
Archaeological sites in Iraq
Sumerian cities
Former populated places in Iraq
Jemdet Nasr period
Former kingdoms